Huishi is a town of Huining County, Gansu, China. It is also the county seat. The town had a population of 136,000 in 2019. In October 1936, the Red Army met in Huishi to celebrate the end of the Long March. The town is named after this event, its name literally means 'meeting of the armies'.

Huishi governs over 8 residential communities and 8 villages.

References 

Township-level divisions of Gansu
County seats of China